KB RTV21 is a Kosovan basketball team that plays in the Siguria Superleague owned by media operator RTV21.

Current roster

References

External links
Eurobasket.com Team Profile

Basketball teams in Kosovo